The peacock mites of the genus Tuckerella (the only genus of the mite family Tuckerellidae) are a significant herbivorous pest in the tropics, for example on citrus fruit. Other species dwell in grasses, possibly as root feeders.

The peacock mite's name suggests that their feather-like (or leaf-like) setae adorning their backs are evocative of a peacock's plumage. 
They also have long hair-like setae projecting from rear (caudal setae) that have been compared to a trailing peacock tail. The 5–7 pairs of caudal setae can be flicked over the body very quickly, so they are used like whips in defense against predators. They may also help in wind-borne dispersal.

They are classified in the superfamily Tetranychoidea, being its most ornate members.

Species
 Tuckerella anommata Smith-Meyer & Ueckermann, 1997 (South Africa)
 Tuckerella channabasavannai Mallik & Kumar, 1992 (host: Saraca indica; Andhra Pradesh)
 Tuckerella eloisae Servin & Otero, 1989 (host: Fouquieria diguetii; Mexico)
 Tuckerella filipina Corpuz-Raros, 2001 (host: Hydnocarpus sp.: Philippines)
 Tuckerella hainanensis Lin & Fu, 1997 (host: Coffea arabica; Hainan)
 Tuckerella jianfengensis Lin & Fu, 1997 (host: Annona muricata; Jianfengling, Hainan)
 Tuckerella kumaonensis Gupta, 1979 (India)
 Tuckerella litoralis Collyer, 1969
 Tuckerella nilotica Zaher & Rasmy, 1970 (Egypt)
 Tuckerella ornatus (Tucker, 1926) – type species
 Tuckerella xiamenensis Lin, 1982 (host: Manilkara zapota)
 Tuckerella xinglongensis Lin-Yanmou & Fu-Yuegua, 1997 (hosts: Polyscias fruticosa var. plumata and Camellia sinensis; Hainan)
 †Tuckerella fossilibus Khaustov, Sergeyenko & Perkovsky 2014 (Rovno amber)
 †Tuckerella weiterschani Sidorchuk & Khaustov, 2018 (Baltic amber)

References

External links

Trombidiformes
Agricultural pest mites
Arachnids of Africa